Scribblenauts Unmasked: A DC Comics Adventure is a puzzle video game developed by 5th Cell and published by Warner Bros. Interactive Entertainment for the Wii U, Nintendo 3DS and Microsoft Windows in September 2013. It is the fifth game in the Scribblenauts series of games and the first based on a licensed property. The game combines the series' traditional gameplay of bringing up words and objects in order to solve puzzles with characters and settings from the DC Comics universe (DC Universe). It was later re-released with a new developer, Shiver Entertainment, for Xbox One, PlayStation 4 and Nintendo Switch as part of the "Scribblenauts Mega Pack" in September 2018.

Gameplay

Following previous games in the series, players control a boy named Maxwell who has the ability to manifest any object or person using his magical notepad. These objects can be used to solve each mission's objective in a variety of ways. The notable feature of this game is the appearance of heroes, supervillains and locations from the DC Universe. According to developer 5th Cell, the game features almost every character in the DC Universe – around 2000 characters in total – ranging from popular characters such as Superman and Wonder Woman to more obscure characters such as Bloodwynd and Matter-Eater Lad. Variations of certain characters are also included, such as multiple Batman interpretations and hundreds of different Green Lanterns. Players can use the assistance of these characters to help solve puzzles, such as using Superman's heat vision to free a key trapped in a block of ice. These characters can also be modified using adjectives, allowing for creations such as "Zombie Batman" or "Super Doomsday".

Players can visit a number of locations from the DC Universe, including the Batcave – which acts as the player's main hub – as well as Gotham City, Atlantis, Metropolis, the Fortress of Solitude, Central City, the Green Lantern Corps base on Oa, and more. In addition, players who find enough Starites will be able to gain access to levels inspired by the origins of the Justice Leaguers.

New additions
Scribblenauts Unmasked includes many new additions, including the DC Universe plot and the new addition of reputation, which can buy certain places and costumes from the Batcomputer. Certain teams can also be searched, but with various rosters; for instance, the roster of the Justice League is the same of that in the New 52, with Superman, Batman, Wonder Woman, Green Lantern, The Flash, Cyborg and Aquaman.

Many of the game's features return from Scribblenauts Unlimited, such as adding adjectives to existing objects without the use of potions, although the only way to get Starites is to participate in battles against DC super villains and Doppelganger, who always appears in these battles.

In the Wii U version, unlike the previous games, Scribblenauts Unmasked features co-op multiplayer, also dubbed Sidekick mode. In Sidekick mode, a second player can use their Wii Remote to highlight a character or object; after non-stop highlighting for a few seconds, the player can play as that character alongside Maxwell and use that character's abilities (for example, playing as Starfire will allow the player to fly and shoot star bolts at enemies). If the player highlights an inanimate object for long enough, he or she can bring that object to life and play as it; doing so will cause the object to float in mid-air in order for the player to move. The player playing as Maxwell can also purchase costumes that give Maxwell the powers or weapons of that respective character.

Another new feature is Maxwell's utility belt, which can be used to summon certain characters and objects without the use of Maxwell's notebook; examples include a grappling hook, a jetpack, the Batmobile, Beast Boy, Raven, Oracle and Starfire.

The rerelease of the game added the DC Rebirth costumes and other new costumes/variants for existing characters. It also added new characters, including the Royal Flush Gang, Atlanna, Jessica Cruz, Ryan Choi and the Batman Who Laughs.

Plot

The story starts with the narrator (Jim Piddock) telling the player about Maxwell and his twin sister Lily, both of whom have a passion for comics and often argue over which of their favorite characters would win in a fight. In order to find out for themselves they use Lily's magic globe (which allows the user to teleport anywhere they desire) combined with a page of Maxwell's notebook (which can bring to life whatever is written in it), but in the teleportation process, the globe is shattered as Maxwell and Lily land in Gotham City and the starites which power it are scattered throughout the DC Universe. Batman finds the children in an alley and believes them to be criminals until Maxwell uses his notebook to aid Batman in a battle with Deadshot. Upon Maxwell and Lily gaining his trust, Batman learns about the starites and why the children need them and offers to help them find them. Batman then reveals that The Joker has been aided by someone who matches Maxwell's description.

Rushing to the Monarch Theatre, Batman, Maxwell and Lily arrive discover Joker's new ally is Maxwell's villainous counterpart Doppelganger, who is attempting to aid the villains in getting the starites for nefarious purposes. After Joker and Doppelganger are defeated, they are somehow able to teleport away before the police arrive. Commissioner James Gordon then reveals that he found the first starite and gives it to Maxwell. Batman grants Maxwell and Lily full access to the Batcave and alerts the rest of the Justice League about the situation at hand. With the first starite restored to the globe, Lily can now teleport Maxwell anywhere in the DC Universe, but lacks the power to take them home. Maxwell is then sent to Metropolis after Superman provides news of a starite's presence.

In Metropolis, Lois Lane and Jimmy Olsen are tied to explosives and guarded by Metallo. Fortunately, Maxwell is able to lure Metallo out of the building so that his kryptonite heart is too far to affect Superman, who proceeds to save the hostages. Apprehended by the police, Metallo reveals that he was hired by Lex Luthor to stall Superman. Maxwell and Superman then head to Lexcorp where Doppelganger uses his notebook to turn Luthor into a kryptonian, making him a match for Superman. After fighting off Doppelganger's creations, Maxwell uses kryptonite to weaken Lex, while giving Superman lead armour so that he won't be affected. Due to their failure, an unseen criminal mastermind teleports Lex and Doppelganger using the same technology that teleported Doppelganger and Joker earlier. Superman manages to find the starite in Lex's lead vault and tells Maxwell not to feel so guilty about summoning Doppelganger. Hal Jordan then provides Maxwell with access to Oa.

On Oa, Sinestro and Doppelgänger have obtained another starite, but it is swiftly stolen by Larfleeze, who considers eating the starite. While Green Lantern holds off Sinestro, Maxwell distracts Larfleeze long enough for him to steal his Orange Lantern power battery, draining just enough greed from Larfleeze to have him give up the starite. Larfleeze then returns the starite, regains the battery and makes his leave. Sinestro and Doppelgänger are forced to retreat after Hal summons the rest of the Green Lantern Corps for backup.

Back at Wayne Manor, Maxwell attends a party hosted by Bruce Wayne. However, one of the guests is soon revealed to be a henchman of Ra's al Ghul and upon the party guests fleeing and Maxwell and Batman apprehending the spy, Ra's and Doppelgänger arrive and summon the League of Assassins to distract Maxwell and Batman while they search for the starite. Batman and Maxwell manage to defeat the League and Ra's, who failed to find the starite, forcing him and Doppelgänger to reluctantly return to Doppelgänger's friend empty handed. Alfred Pennyworth then reveals that he found the starite in the garden before the party started and chose not to show it until he felt it was necessary.

At Arkham Asylum, Maxwell is greeted by Batgirl who (to her own confusion), recognizes Maxwell. The Scarecrow has managed to track down a starite to one of the prison towers. As Batgirl rushes towards him, they disappear in a puff of fear gas which Maxwell inhales, causing him to see hallucinations of his brothers which he is able to dispose of by giving them various items they want. After shrinking a hallucination of his father, Maxwell finds himself bound by a chain held upside down to lower him into a bathtub of acid. The chain is seemingly operated by Lily, but after Maxwell blows away the fear gas and its effects wear off, the hallucination is revealed to Doppelgänger and Scarecrow, who are swiftly defeated by Batgirl. Due to Doppelgänger accidentally inhaling some fear gas himself, he mistakes the starite for a snake and throws it to Batgirl, much to Scarecrow's dismay as it means they will have to return to "him" empty handed again. Batgirl then frees Maxwell and to return the favor for saving his life, Maxwell uses a time machine to heal her spine.

Heading to Joker's abandoned funhouse lair, Maxwell is greeted by Robin, who reveals there is a starite hiding somewhere that Doppelgänger and Harley Quinn are searching for. The two of them continuously hide in various objects to evade Maxwell and Robin, but it proves to be futile as the two young heroes are able to destroy their hiding spots by conjuring people associated with the objects. Out of irritation, Harley summons Poison Ivy to back up her and Doppelgänger with giant carnivorous plants which Maxwell is able to kill. Overwhelmed by the heroes, Doppelgänger and the two Gotham City Sirens retreat. As they do, Robin is able to find the starite on the ceiling, bringing up Harley's stupidity in the process. Having heard of the event with Ra's Al Ghul, Robin decides to return to Wayne Manor.

At Superman's Fortress of Solitude, the Phantom Zone projector malfunctions and releases General Zod. After using the projector on Superman, Zod orders Doppelgänger to dispose of him, which Doppelgänger attempts to do by summoning augmented versions of various Superman enemies. Maxwell is able to defeat them by exploiting their weaknesses. Angered at his incompetence, Zod attempts to use Doppelgänger's book for himself, which distracts him long enough for Maxwell to steal the projector, free Superman from the Phantom Zone and send Zod back. Doppelgänger's "friend" is angered at the loss of another starite and teleports Doppelgänger away. Superman then reveals that he retrieved a starite from the Phantom Zone.

After Maxwell teleports to the Watchtower, Cyborg reveals that someone has hacked the Watchtower security system to grant them unauthorized access. That someone is soon revealed to be Deathstroke and Doppelgänger, who release Amazo from his cell. Overwhelmed by Amazo's combined powers, Maxwell calls for backup to aid him and Cyborg. Realizing the odds are no longer in their favor, Deathstroke uses the technology of Doppelgänger's "friend" so that he and Doppelgänger can escape. Cyborg then finds the starite in Amazo's cell.

In Central City, Maxwell and The Flash race against Professor Zoom and Doppelgänger in a charity race hosted by Booster Gold where the winner will receive a starite. During the race, Doppelgänger attempts to cheat by slowing down the Flash with tar, ice and smoke, which Maxwell counters. Getting carried away, Doppelgänger gives him and Zoom a jetpack, which backfires horribly and launches them out of the race. Having won the race, Maxwell and Flash gain the starite.

Nearby Atlantis, Maxwell and Aquaman face off against Doppelgänger and Ocean Master, who send Aquaman to the bottom of a deep pit. To aid Ocean Master against Maxwell, Doppelgänger creates a giant crab he dubs "Crabmongous", which Maxwell is able to lure into the same pit Aquaman was sucked into with some food. With Crabmongous defeated, Doppelgänger's friend teleports Doppelgänger and Ocean Master to his lair. Aquaman escapes the pit with the starite.

On Themiscira, Wonder Woman and Maxwell battle Doppelgänger and Cheetah, who is transformed into various beasts from Greek mythology which Maxwell is able counter. Angered by their failure once more, Doppelgänger's "friend" teleports Cheetah and Doppelgänger away. Maxwell and Wonder Woman manage to find a starite that had been unearthed by the water Doppelgänger used to aid Cheetah's Kraken form.

Returning to the Watchtower, Cyborg reveals to the Justice League that the last starite is on an abandoned Injustice League Satellite. With the power of all but one of the starites, Lily teleports Maxwell, herself and the Justice League, to the location. When they arrive, Cyborg is paralyzed while the rest of the League is forced to face the villains they had faced while trying to obtain the starites. Maxwell learns that Cyborg had been deceived and the entire venture to the area was a trap. After defeating the villains once more, Maxwell, Lily and the Justice League discover that Doppelgänger's friend is Brainiac who steals Lily's globe, combine it with a Mother Box and the last starite, teleport away the villains and proceeds to do the same to one Justice Leaguer after the other, though he is confused as to why he can't dispose of Maxwell and Lily. Brainiac then reveals his master plan: to open a dimensional rift and combine with the other 51 versions of himself to destroy the multiverse. Feeling confused as he can no longer tell if Brainiac is his friend, Doppelgänger becomes reluctant to follow his orders. Realizing the source of Doppelgänger's evil was his lack of the feeling of friendship, Maxwell creates a twin sister for Doppelgänger (who resembles Lily) named "Doppelily", causing both to reform and side with Maxwell and Lily. Unfortunately, Brainiac (who has already succeeded in summoning four additional versions of himself) incapacitates Doppelgänger. After Cyborg is repaired and teleported away, Doppelily reveals that Brainiac could not teleport Maxwell and Lily because they were from another universe, which means they could have only been affected if they were an alternate version of Brainiac. Learning this, Maxwell summons various parallel universe Justice Leaguers who are able to defeat the Brainiac Collective. After obtaining the completed globe, Maxwell, Lily and Doppelily return to the Watchtower and take an injured Doppelgänger with them.

After recovering from his injuries, Doppelgänger is scolded by the Justice League for his actions. With Doppelily's help, Doppelgänger vows never to do evil ever again and proves that he keeps his promise by undoing the damage he had done. As Maxwell and Lily say their goodbyes and prepare to return home, the narrator is revealed to be Alfred Pennyworth, who has grown fond of Maxwell and bids him and Lily a sincere fare well.

In the "Scribblenauts Mega Pack", there are two additional missions where Maxwell obtains two more starites. In one of them, Maxwell pretends to be Doppelgänger at Belle Reve Penitentiary, so Amanda Waller forces him to aide the Suicide Squad in defeating Brimstone. In the other mission at Titans Tower, Maxwell helps the Teen Titans defeat the Bizarro League and Trigon.

Reception

In Metacritic, the game holds a 68% approval rating across its PC and 3DS versions, whilst holding a 71% on its Wii U version, all indicating "mixed or average" reviews.

GameZone's Mike Splechta gave the PC version 8/10, stating that Unmasked had "a lot to offer, given its plethora of challenges and the equally impressive number of ways to solve them". IGN gave it a 9.1, saying it "is a super way to exercise your mind as well as your love of DC characters." Will Greenwald of PCMag gave the game 3.5 out of 5 stars, praising the addition of several DC characters and objects to create, though he criticised the absence of DC Vertigo characters, the weak goal-oriented gameplay, and stating that "it's a nerd sandbox for fans of the DC universe". In a review for Destructoid, the game was given a 7 out of 10 by Ian Bonds, noting the abundance and lack of content, calling it "not so heroic" with its "hard-to-ignore faults", though he cited the experience as "fun" and "solid", and also recommended players to get an audience while they play.

In a more mixed review on CBR.com by Steve Sunu, he states that the game is "ambitious" and "fun", though with its huge amount of content and a lacklustre execution, later called it "ultimately flawed". He also gave a mixed view about its puzzles, noting them as faithful to the DC Universe, though noting the backwards method of delivery for the puzzles— saying "every other puzzle in the zone continuously switches out every time" and as a result, stated "there's no real way to measure progress". He also criticised the random encounters (though not from an NPC) that would revert the player's progress should it appear during a puzzle.

References

2013 video games
Wii U games
Wii U eShop games
Nintendo 3DS games
Nintendo 3DS eShop games
Nintendo Network games
Windows games
5th Cell games
Action-adventure games
Puzzle video games
Video games developed in the United States
Warner Bros. video games
Unmasked
Video games with user-generated gameplay content
Video games based on DC Comics
Video games based on Justice League
Superhero video games
Crossover video games
Video games with Steam Workshop support
Video games set in the United States
Video games set in Atlantis
Video games set on fictional planets